The Attention Tour was a music festival tour by American singer Miley Cyrus in support of her seventh studio album, Plastic Hearts (2020).

Set list
This set list is representative of the concert on March 21, 2022. It does not represent all concerts for the duration of the tour.

"Attention" 
 "We Can't Stop" 
 "WTF Do I Know"
 "Plastic Hearts"
 "Heart of Glass"
 "Mother's Daughter"
 "4x4"
 "(SMS) Bangerz"
 "Dooo It!"
 "23"
 "Never Be Me"
 "Angels like You"
 "High"
 "You"
 "The Climb"
 "7 Things"
 "Bang Bang" / "See You Again"
 "Fly on the Wall"
 "Nothing Breaks Like a Heart"
 "Jolene"
 "Midnight Sky"
Encore
 "Wrecking Ball"
 "Party in the U.S.A."

Tour dates

Cancelled shows

Notes

References

2022 concert tours
Miley Cyrus concert tours
Concert tours of the United States
Concert tours of South America